

D11A Other dermatological preparations

D11AA Antihidrotics
D11AA01 Glycopyrronium

D11AC Medicated shampoos
D11AC01 Cetrimide
D11AC02 Cadmium compounds
D11AC03 Selenium compounds
D11AC06 Povidone-iodine
D11AC08 Sulfur compounds
D11AC09 Xenysalate
D11AC30 Others

D11AE Androgens for topical use
D11AE01 Metandienone

D11AF Wart and anti-corn preparations
Empty group

D11AH Agents for dermatitis, excluding corticosteroids
D11AH01 Tacrolimus
D11AH02 Pimecrolimus
D11AH03 Cromoglicic acid
D11AH04 Alitretinoin
D11AH05 Dupilumab
D11AH06 Crisaborole
D11AH07 Tralokinumab
D11AH08 Abrocitinib
D11AH09 Ruxolitinib
QD11AH90 Oclacitinib
QD11AH91 Lokivetmab

D11AX Other dermatologicals
D11AX01 Minoxidil
D11AX02 Gamolenic acid
D11AX03 Calcium gluconate
D11AX04 Lithium succinate
D11AX05 Magnesium sulfate
D11AX06 Mequinol
D11AX08 Tiratricol
D11AX09 Oxaceprol
D11AX10 Finasteride
D11AX11 Hydroquinone
D11AX12 Pyrithione zinc
D11AX13 Monobenzone
D11AX16 Eflornithine
D11AX18 Diclofenac
D11AX21 Brimonidine
D11AX22 Ivermectin
D11AX23 Aminobenzoate potassium
D11AX24 Deoxycholic acid
D11AX25 Hydrogen peroxide
D11AX26 Caffeine
D11AX27 Oxymetazoline
D11AX52 Gamolenic acid, combinations
D11AX57 Collagen, combinations
QD11AX90 Benzoylperoxide

References

D11